Colin Grafton (born September 19, 1991, in Providence, Rhode Island) is an American pair skater and model. With former partner Kylie Duarte, he is the 2012 U.S. junior bronze medalist and finished eighth at the 2012 World Junior Championships in Minsk. The pair announced the end of their partnership in October 2012.

Programs 
(with Duarte)

Competitive highlights 
(with Duarte)

Dancing on Ice
In 2023, Grafton appeared in series 15 of ITV's Dancing on Ice, partnered with The Vivienne.

References

External links 

 
 Kylie Duarte / Colin Grafton at Ice Network

American male pair skaters
1991 births
Living people
Sportspeople from Providence, Rhode Island
People from North Attleborough, Massachusetts